Jessica Elizabeth Adair (born December 19, 1986) is an American professional basketball player who played most recently for the Minnesota Lynx in the WNBA. Adair is currently playing for the Townsville Fire in the Australian WNBL.

Personal
Born December 19, 1986 in Washington, D.C. Her full name is Jessica Elizabeth Adair (pronounced 'AY-dare'). She is the daughter of Angela Monica Adair. Her twin sister, Jazmine, also played at George Washington. She majored in criminal justice.

College career
Averaged 12.7 points, 6.6 rebounds and 1.4 blocks per game over her four-year career at George Washington. A three-time All-Atlantic First Team selection. Completed her career ranked 11th on GW's career scoring list (1,475 points), 7th in career rebounds (770 rebounds) and 5th in career blocks (161 blocks). Led the Colonials in scoring (13.7 ppg), rebounding (7.4 rpg), blocks (1.7 bpg), steals (1.1 spg) and field goal percentage (.584) her senior year. Finalist for USA Basketball's 2007 Pan Am Games squad. Helped GW advance to the NCAA Tournament in both 2006 and 2007, and registered a 15-point, 21-rebound outing in the first-round victory over Boise State during her sophomore season (March 17, 2007).

George  Washington statistics
Source

WNBA career
2009: Drafted by Phoenix in the 3rd round (34th overall) in the 2009 draft. She was later waived on May 13.2010: She was signed by Minnesota on April 22 and appeared in one preseason game with the Lynx, totaling 14 points, six rebounds, three steals and three blocks (in 26:06) April 30 vs. Chicago in St. Paul, but missed the May 6 rematch in Chicago due to a strained left hip. She was then waived on May 14. She then signed as a free agent later that season on August 18, and drew a DNP-CD at Los Angeles on August 20. Made her WNBA debut by appearing in the August 22 season finale at Indiana, collecting five points and a team-high eight rebounds (logging 13:35) in Minnesota's OT victory.2011: She was re-signed by the Lynx on February 1. During the 2011 season, Adair started one game and served as the primary backup to center Taj McWilliams-Franklin. She appeared in 31 games drawing three DNP-CD early in the season.

Adair was injured throughout much of the 2012 season, and was released by the Lynx prior to the 2013 season.

Overseas
2010–11: Played for Samsun in the Turkish League where she played in 25 games, averaging 14.4 points and 10.3 rebounds per game.

WNBA career statistics

Regular season

|-
| align="left" | 2010
| align="left" | Minnesota
| 1 || 0 || 14.0 || 1.000 || .000 || .750 || 8.0 || 0.0 || 0.0 || 0.0 || 0.0 || 5.0
|-
| style="text-align:left;background:#afe6ba;"|  2011†
| align="left" | Minnesota
| 31 || 1 || 10.4 || .485 || .000 || .653 || 2.9 || 0.3 || 0.3 || 0.6 || 0.9 ||4.3
|-
| align="left" | 2012
| align="left" | Minnesota
| 19 || 0 || 8.8 || .351 || .000 || .571 || 2.1 || 0.3 || 0.2 || 0.2 || 0.7 || 2.4
|-
| align="left" | Career
| align="left" | 3 years, 1 team
| 51 || 1 || 9.9 || .454 || .000 || .625 || 2.7 || 0.3 || 0.2 || 0.4 || 0.8 || 3.6

Playoffs

|-
| style="text-align:left;background:#afe6ba;"|  2011†
| align="left" | Minnesota
| 8 || 0 || 12.3 || .469 || .000 || 0.667 || 3.6 || 0.3 || 0.6 || 0.6 || 5.8
|-
| align="left" | 2012
| align="left" | Minnesota
| 4 || 0 || 0.8 || 1.000 || .000 || .000 || 0.5 || 0.0 || 0.0 || 0.0 || 0.0 || 0.5
|-
| align="left" | Career
| align="left" | 2 years, 1 team
| 12 || 0 || 8.4 || .485 || .000 || .667 || 2.6 || 0.2 || 0.4 || 0.4 || 1.0 || 4.0

External links

WNBA Player Profile
Minnesota Lynx Profile – Behind the Jersey of Jessica Adair
Lynx look to keep ‘Special Season’ going as second half begins

1986 births
Living people
American expatriate basketball people in Australia
American expatriate basketball people in Turkey
American women's basketball players
Basketball players from Washington, D.C.
Centers (basketball)
George Washington Colonials women's basketball players
Minnesota Lynx players
Phoenix Mercury draft picks